Lala Nisar Muhammad Khan (  – 23 February 2016), also known as Lala Nisar, was a Pakistani politician, senator, member of parliament, and cabinet minister, who served railway minister during the Muhammad Khan Junejo's government, and later housing and works minister in 2008 while representing province Khyber Pakhtunkhwa of Pakistan.

He was born to Yar Mohammad Khan in Charsadda district of Khyber Pakhtunkhwa. He had three sons, including Fazal Muhammad Khan, Naseer Mohammad Khan, and former Member of the Provincial Assembly Saeed Mohammad Khan. In 1955, he went to England where he received his higher education, including graduation in 1966. He attended Islamia College Peshawar at faculty of arts for further or earlier studies. Before graduating in UK, he attended the Lawrence College Ghora Gali.

Political career 
Nisar started his political career after returning to home from the United Kingdom. He contested his first-ever election in 1966 and was elected as the member of parliament for West Pakistan. Later, he contested in 1985 Pakistani general election as an independent candidate and was elected as the member of National Assembly of Pakistan until the next elections. During the period, he served adviser to the federal government for health and railways ministries. He is also credited for his contribution to the Pakistan Peoples Party's formation. On the occasion of a political speech against Ayub Khan delivered by then Pakistan's 16th prime minister Zulfikar Ali Bhutto, Nisar was inspired by the speech which was aimed at on the Tashkent Declaration and he subsequently joined the party. However, he later disassociated himself from the party over Bhutto's policies against farmers, and later he formed the Zamindar Tehreek (Farmer's movement) party aimed at to oppose political agenda of Bhutto.

From 1971 to 1990, he was a selected member of the coalition against the National Awami Party. It is believed he and Khan Abdul Wali Khan were very close to each other, leading him not to contested further elections against Wali Khan. During his last elections, he joined Pakistan Muslim League (N) political party and served as a senator while represented Khyber Pakhtunkhwa. He was later appointed Khidmat Committee's chairperson for Peshawar Division. He according to The Express Tribune supported Nawaz Sharif during the 1999 Pakistani coup d'état, and later joined the Pakistan Muslim League (Q).

Arrests 
He along with Asfandyar Wali Khan was charged with Hayat Sherpao's murder case and was imprisoned from February 1975 to July 1977. He was released from the jail after the Operation Fair Play was launched by a military dictator Muhammad Zia-ul-Haq against Zulfikar Ali Bhutto.

Death 
He died of a cardiac arrest on 24 February 2016 in Charsadda town of Khyber Pakhtunkhwa.

References

Notes

1930 births
2016 deaths
People from Charsadda District, Pakistan
Politicians from Khyber Pakhtunkhwa
Members of the Senate of Pakistan
Lawrence College Ghora Gali alumni
20th-century Pakistani politicians